Bettany is a surname. Notable people with the surname include:

Colin Bettany (born 1932), English professional footballer
Fred Bettany (1860–1924), English footballer
George Thomas Bettany (1850–1891), British biologist and author
John Bettany (born 1937), English former professional footballer
Paul Bettany (born 1971), English actor
Thane Bettany, British actor and former dancer

Given name
Bettany Hughes (born 1968), English historian, broadcaster and writer

See also
 Bethany (disambiguation)
 Betania (disambiguation)
 Bethania (disambiguation)
 Bettani
 Bettini

External links
"Origin - Bettan(e)y" at One Name Study Organisation